Tineke Postma (born August 31, 1978) is a Dutch jazz saxophonist.

Career
At the age of eleven, Postma began playing the saxophone. She studied at the Amsterdam Conservatory between 1996 and 2003 and obtained a master's degree in music. Her teachers included David Liebman, Dick Oatts, and Chris Potter. In 2005, she began teaching at the Amsterdam Conservatory.

Postma worked with Terri Lyne Carrington on the album The Mosaic Project in 2011. She has performed with Greg Osby, Geri Allen, Ivan Paduart, Esperanza Spalding, and the Metropole Orchestra.

Discography
 For the Rhythm (Munich, 2005)
 A Journey That Matters (Foreign Media, 2007)
 The Traveller (Etcetera, 2009)
 The Dawn of Light (Challenge, 2011)
 Le Peuple Des Silencieux (W.E.R.F., 2014)
 Sonic Halo (Challenge, 2014)
 We Will Really Meet Again with Nathalie Loriers, Nicolas Thys (W.E.R.F., 2016)
 Freya (Edition, 2020)

References

External links

 Official site

1978 births
Living people
Dutch jazz saxophonists
People from Heerenveen
Women jazz saxophonists
21st-century saxophonists
21st-century women musicians
Edition Records artists
Challenge Records (1994) artists